The Mosque of Amir Qijmas al-Ishaqi or Abu Hurayba Mosque (sometimes written Abu Heriba) is a late Mamluk-era mosque in Cairo, Egypt. It dates from 1480-81 CE and is located in the historic al-Darb al-Ahmar district, near Bab Zuweila. It is considered by many to be one of the finest examples of late Mamluk architecture.

Historical background

The mosque was likely begun in the late 1470s and completed in 1480-1481. It was commissioned by a Burji Mamluk amir (commander) called Sayf al-Din Qijmas al-Ishaqi who served during the rule of Sultan Qaitbay. He served in several highly important positions such as amir akhur (officer in charge of the royal stables) and amir al-hajj (officer in charge of the pilgrimage to Mecca, the Hajj). He was also appointed governor of Alexandria in 1470 and then governor of Syria in 1480, a position he retained until his peaceful death in 1487. During his tenure in Syria he built a new tomb for himself in Damascus and he was buried there instead of in the mausoleum of the mosque he had built in Cairo.

His mosque in Cairo was built on what was then the main road between the southern city gate, Bab Zuweila, and the Citadel of Cairo, passing through what is now known as the Al-Darb al-Ahmar district. The mosque's popular name, the Mosque of Abu Hurayba (or Abu Heriba, among other spellings), is derived from the Sheikh Abu Hurayba, who was known as a wali and was buried in the domed mausoleum in 1852. The mosque is also known today for being featured on the 50 Egyptian pound bill.

Architecture

Overview and layout 
The mosque is considered a remarkable example of late Mamluk architecture, especially due to the architect's ingenious arrangement of the building's different elements to make them fit into an irregular plot of land in the angle between El-Darb El-Ahmar Street and another lane joining it to the north. Such creative layouts were characteristic of Mamluk buildings as Cairo's density increased and builders were forced to adapt to limited available land. The main part of the site is roughly shaped like a right triangle, between the angle of the two streets, while an annex stands across the lane to the north and is connected to the main building via a raised passage (sabat) above the street.

Exterior 
The main building includes the mosque itself, the domed mausoleum, the minaret, and the sabil (water dispensary). The exterior of this building is partitioned into multiple facades that reveal themselves one after another to anyone walking down the main street coming from Bab Zuweila (the nearby city gate), projecting towards the street but without impeding traffic. All around the base of the building, and built into it, are shops which provided revenues for the mosque, while the mosque itself is raised above these and its entrance is reached by a set of stairs (a recurring arrangement dating back to the much older Mosque of Salih Tala'i nearby).

The exterior of the mosque is marked by highly refined decoration exemplifying the sophisticated architectural style of Qaytbay's reign. This decoration includes arabesque stone carvings, rows of muqarnas carvings above the windows, and compositions of multi-colored (red, black and white) inlaid marble. The circular marble medallion above the entrance, forming a swirling pattern, is considered particularly remarkable and unmatched. The wooden doors of the entrance are overlaid with decorative bronze fittings. The doors once had metal knockers carved in an elaborate design featuring two dragon heads (similar to a famous Anatolian example now on display in the Museum of Turkish and Islamic Arts in Istanbul), but they were stolen at a recent date. Another secondary entrance to the mosque, at the back of the building, is marked by further panels of exquisite decoration above.

The annex to the north of the main building consists of a water trough for animals (known as a hod), enclosed by walls with further stone-carved decoration, and above this a kuttab (primary school teaching the Qur'an). In Mamluk architecture the kuttab is more typically located above the sabil, so its location here, separated from the sabil, is uncommon. The hamam (bathhouse) and ablutions area of the mosque are also located here. The bridge passage between the two parts of the complex also has an upper level with mashrabiyya windows, suggesting this may have been used as living quarters or a residential unit.

Interior 

The main entrance leads to the mosque via a vestibule with a richly decorated ceiling and a passage interrupted by large skylight. This passage between the vestibule and the mosque is also joined by another passage leading from the mosque's rear entrance. At the end of the passage, at the entrance to the mosque area, is a set of wooden sliding doors, one of only two such examples in Mamluk architecture.

The mosque interior has a layout which had evolved from earlier "cruciform" madrasas and is equivalent to a qa'a (reception hall). It has two main iwans (large rooms open to one side) to the west and east, including the qibla side (the direction of prayer), and two smaller iwans to the north and south. Between these iwans is a central space which, in earlier buildings, used to be a courtyard (sahn), but here is covered by a wooden roof with a broad lantern. The iwans are raised one step above this central area. This type of layout is found in many other buildings of this era, including the Funerary complex of Qaytbay and the Madrasa of the Sultan al-Ghuri Complex. The mausoleum chamber of the building, which is plain but covered by a dome, is accessed through the qibla-side iwan.

The decoration of the interior is also very rich, featuring ablaq (two-colored) masonry, marble paneling along the lower walls (dadoes), Arabic inscriptions, and stone carvings. The monumental inscription in golden thuluth Arabic script running around the upper walls describes the piety of amir Qijmas. The wooden lantern ceiling above this is decorated with geometric patterns, while the wooden ceilings of the iwans are gilded and decorated with painted arabesque patterns. The floors of the mosque are paved with decorative marble (but are typically covered by the mosque's carpeting). The windows feature coloured glass set into stucco grilles. The appearance of cypress tree motifs in the windows suggests that the current stucco grilles may date to an Ottoman-era restoration.

The mihrab area 

The mihrab and the qibla wall around it feature an unprecedented decorative technique: white marble inlaid with thin lines of black bitumen and red paste to form elaborate arabesque patterns. This new technique, later re-used elsewhere, may have reflected a scarcity of marble materials needed to execute the usual multi-coloured marble mosaics seen in earlier Mamluk buildings, or it may have been motivated by a desire to form more intricate patterns not possible with those earlier techniques. Most of the mihrab is covered with this type of decoration, at the middle of which is a star or flower-shaped rosette which contains the mirrored signature of the craftsman, named as 'Abd al-Qadir "the Engraver" (al-Naqqash). Such a signature at the middle of the mihrab, a niche which symbolizes the direction of prayer, is considered highly unusual in mosque architecture. The conch (semi-dome) of the mihrab niche is covered with more conventional geometric star patterns, with the name Allah appearing at the middle of some of the stars. Just below the conch is a Qur'anic inscription (part of verse 2:144, in the Surah al-Baqarah) in Kufic script. The voussoirs around the arch of the mihrab are in turn inlaid with arabesque patterns similar to those of the mihrab of the Mosque of al-Mu'ayyad.

The surfaces of the wooden minbar (pulpit) of the mosque are decorated with geometric sixteen-pointed star patterns emanating from round bosses. The decorative effect is achieved by different coloured inlays instead of the deep carvings of earlier minbars.

Present-day condition
The mosque is well-preserved overall but is in need of restoration. The original kuttab in the northern annex of the mosque is still in use as a primary school. At some point in recent years, the elaborate metal knockers of the main doors, which featured carved dragon heads, were stolen. In 2017, Al Wafd newspaper criticized the condition of the mosque as resulting from the negligence on the part of the Ministry of the Antiquity. According to the paper, the main facade is deteriorated and the surrounding is filled with garbage piles.

Gallery

See also
  Lists of mosques 
  List of mosques in Africa
  List of mosques in Egypt

References

Bibliography
Behrens-Abouseif, Doris. Islamic Architecture in Cairo. Leiden: E. J. Brill, 1989.
Jarrar, Sabri, András Riedlmayer, and Jeffrey B. Spurr. Resources for the Study of Islamic Architecture. Cambridge, MA: Aga Khan Program for Islamic Architecture, 1994.

15th-century mosques
Mosque buildings with domes
Mamluk architecture in Egypt
Mosques in Cairo
Medieval Cairo